KWBH-LD (channel 27) is a low-power television station in Rapid City, South Dakota, United States. It is a translator of dual NBC/MyNetworkTV affiliate KNBN (channel 21) which is owned by Jim Simpson's Rapid Broadcasting. KWBH-LD's transmitter is located on Cowboy Hill west of downtown; its parent station maintains studios on South Plaza Drive in Rapid City.

History
The station signed on for the first time on April 2, 1998 as an NBC affiliate on analog channel 27 with the call letters KNBN-LP. In 2000, Rapid Broadcasting began airing NBC programming on full-power KNBN (channel 21). Before KNBN's upgrade to a full-power station, KUSA in Denver had served as Rapid City's de facto NBC affiliate on area cable systems. At the same time, channel 27 became a WB affiliate and carried programming from The CW Plus' predecessor, The WB 100+ Station Group. In September 2006, UPN and The WB merged to become The CW. KWBH-LP joined the new network upon its launch. In 2017, KWBH-LP switched to MyNetworkTV after losing The CW to a subchannel of CBS affiliate KCLO-TV (channel 15).

KWBH-LP went silent in March 2021, ahead of the FCC-mandated shutdown of analog LPTV stations on July 13. Its programming was carried in high definition on KNBN's second digital subchannel. KWBH-LP filed a digital license to cover application on December 16, 2021, indicating that it would rebroadcast KNBN. The station was licensed for digital operation effective February 4, 2022, changing its call sign to KWBH-LD.

Previous logos

Subchannels
This station rebroadcasts the subchannels of full-power KNBN.

References

External links
 NewsCenter1

WBH-LD
NBC network affiliates
MyNetworkTV affiliates
Television channels and stations established in 1997
1997 establishments in South Dakota
Low-power television stations in the United States